Tureta is a Local Government Area in Sokoto State, Nigeria. Its headquarters is in the town of Tureta. It shares a border with Zamfara State in the south and east. They are mainly Hausa people predominantly Burmawa.  Islam is there main religion.  Fishing and farming are the major occupations. Currently Dr Muhammad Danrabi Tureta is their newly appointed king title as sarkin Burmin tureta.

Tureta has an area of 2,383 km and a population of 68,370 at the 2006 census.

The postal code of the area is 852.

References

Local Government Areas in Sokoto State